The flag of the Kabardino-Balkarian Autonomous Soviet Socialist Republic was adopted in 1957 by the government of the Kabardino-Balkarian Autonomous Soviet Socialist Republic. The flag is identical to the flag of the Russian Soviet Federative Socialist Republic.

History

First version 
The first constitution of the Kabardino-Balkarian ASSR was adopted by the Extraordinary 10th Congress of Soviets of the Kabardino-Balkarian ASSR on June 24, 1937, and was approved on June 2, 1940, by the Supreme Soviet of the RSFSR. Article 112 of the constitution described the flag of the Kabardino-Balkarian ASSR:

Revision 
On July 26, 1938, the inscriptions on the flag underwent minor changes. The Balkar language writing system was changed into Cyrillic letters, and the name of the republic was changed in Kabardin language.

Second version (as the Kabardin ASSR) 
In 1944, the Balkar people were accused of aiding the Nazis, and almost all of the entire population was deported. The word "Balkar" was removed from the name of the republic. The flag of the Kabardin ASSR was a red cloth with gold inscriptions "RSFSR" and "Kabardian ASSR" (in Russian and Kabardin languages). The flag was described in Article 112 of the 1945 Constitution of the Kabardin ASSR.

Third version (as the Kabardin ASSR) 
After the introduction of the new version of the RSFSR flag, the flag of the Kabardin ASSR was changed. On June 15, 1954, the Law on the State Flag of the Kabardin ASSR changed the description of the flag in Article 112 of the Constitution of the Republic.

Fourth version (as the Kabardino-Balkarian ASSR) 
By a decree of January 9, 1957, the Presidium of the Supreme Soviet of the USSR restored the Kabardino-Balkarian Autonomous Soviet Socialist Republic. The law of the Kabardino-Balkarian Autonomous Soviet Socialist Republic of March 29, 1957 established that the abbreviation on the flag of the republic should be performed in three languages.

By the Decree of the PVS of the Kabardino-Balkarian ASSR on September 30, 1966, the Regulation on the Flag of the Kabardino-Balkar Autonomous Soviet Socialist Republic in 1956 was amended.

On November 16, 1971, the Council of Ministers of the Kabardino-Balkarian ASSR, approved the Application of the Regulations on the State Flag of the Kabardino-Balkarian ASSR by Resolution No. 489.

Revision 
According to the new Constitution of the Kabardino-Balkarian ASSR, which was adopted on May 26, 1978, the names of the Kabardino-Balkarian ASSR on flag became the full name of the state (rather than abbreviation). This was confirmed by article 158 of the Constitution of the Kabardino-Balkarian ASSR.

By the decree of the Presidium of the Supreme Soviet of the Kabardino-Balkarian ASSR on October 25, 1978, the design of the flag was approved. On September 26, 1979, the PVS of the Kabardino-Balkarian ASSR approved the Regulations on the State Flag of the Kabardino-Balkarian ASSR. The description of the flag in this position was supplemented with a paragraph on the relative sizes of the elements:

On November 10, 1981, the Council of Ministers adopted a new edition of the Application of the Regulations on the State Flag of the Kabardino-Balkarian ASSR

Gallery

References

Citations

Bibliography 

Kabardino-Balkarian Autonomous Soviet Socialist Republic
1937 establishments in the Soviet Union
1994 disestablishments in Russia